Norway has 98 airports which are certified or have been designed an International Civil Aviation Organization airport code (ICAO code). Forty-eight airports facilitate public flights, including one heliport, Værøy Heliport. Forty-five of these are owned by the government through its airport operator, Avinor. Scheduled airports are grouped into primary airports, which are sufficiently large to serve jetliners, and regional airports, which can only handle regional aircraft.

The airports used only for general aviation (GA) are owned by a mix of municipalities, aviation clubs and private companies. The latter include some which are controlled by the state or municipalities. Two are owned by the Norwegian Armed Forces. The Royal Norwegian Air Force has ten air stations which are co-located with primary airports ("joint" airports).

Oslo Airport, Gardermoen is by a factor of almost four the busiest airport in the country, about half of which is international services. It opened in 1998—replacing Oslo Airport, Fornebu— and serves as a hub for Norwegian Air Shuttle and Scandinavian Airlines (SAS). It is followed by three other major airports, Bergen Airport, Flesland; Stavanger Airport; and Trondheim Airport, Værnes. These act as focus cities for said airlines. The four next airports are of almost equal size. Sandefjord Airport, Torp serves low-cost airlines in Eastern Norway and are often branded as "Oslo" by airlines such as Ryanair. Bodø Airport and Tromsø Airport act as hubs within Northern Norway, from which Widerøe flies to regional airports. Oslo, Trondheim and Bergen have a similar function in Southern Norway.

Norway is the country in Europe with the most airline trips per capita. The routes from Oslo to Trondheim, Bergen and Stavanger are all amongst the ten busiest in Europe. Contributing causes are a low population density, a rugged geography and limited population in the interior and the north, which combined have resulted in a poor road and rail infrastructure. Many smaller airport have short runways which permit only fairly small aircraft on short routes. Future lack of compatible aircraft has started plans to extending some, close down some (combined with road improvement) and to replace a few with new airports.

Airports
The list includes fixed-wing airports approved by the CAA and those with an ICAO code. In addition, closed land airports are included if they were either issued ICAO codes or they served scheduled flights. Heliports are only included if they have scheduled flights and are part of the regional aviation system. Water aerodromes are excluded.

The list contains the airport name, the city served and the county in which the airport is located (which may differ from the county of the city served). The type of airport is subdivided into primary airports, regional airports (one marked as a heliport), military (used exclusively by the Norwegian Armed Forces), joint (airports with both a civilian airport and a military air base), GA (used exclusively for general aviation) and closed airports. The ownership consists of airports owned by Avinor, municipally-owned airports, airports owned by the military, those owned by aviation clubs, and privately owned through a limited company. The list further states the ICAO code and the International Air Transport Association airport code (IATA code). The length of the longest runway (rwy) is stated. Passenger data (pax) is for 2016 and counts both boarding and disembarking passengers. Airport names shown in bold indicate airports with scheduled service on commercial airlines.

Evolution in graph

See also

List of the busiest airports in the Nordic countries
List of heliports in Norway
Scandinavian Mountains Airport (Sälen Trysil Airport)

References

Norway
 
 
Norway